The 2018–19 Toledo Rockets women's basketball team represents University of Toledo during the 2018–19 NCAA Division I women's basketball season. The Rockets, led by eleventh year head coach Tricia Cullop, play their home games at Savage Arena, as members of the West Division of the Mid-American Conference. They finished the season 21–12, 11–7 in MAC play to finish in second place in the West Division. They advanced to the quarterfinals of the MAC women's tournament where they lost to Miami (OH). They received an at-large bid to the Women's National Invitation Tournament where they defeated Seton Hall in the first round before losing to Northwestern in the second round.

Roster

Schedule
Source:

|-
!colspan=9 style=| Exhibition

|-
!colspan=9 style=| Non-conference regular season

|-
!colspan=9 style=| MAC regular season

|-
!colspan=9 style=| MAC Women's Tournament

|-
!colspan=9 style=| WNIT

See also
 2018–19 Toledo Rockets men's basketball team

References

Toledo
Toledo Rockets women's basketball seasons
Toledo